Sher Mountain Killings Mystery is a 1990 Australian film directed by Vince Martin and Phillip Avalon. This film is categorized as an "Ozploitation" horror film. The synopsis for this film is “Nobody trusted that the Gem has mysterious power. From thieves’ perspectives, it was just another jewel. But not everything is as it appears ("Sher Mountain Killings Mystery (1990) - IMDb", 2003).’ The film differentiate itself from other horror film with the concepts such as Old Ranger’s castle, cursed stone and Mysterious power which adds more Australianness tone to the film.

Denis Whitburn wrote the script who was gaining notice at the time with his work on Blood Oath. According to the Beyond press kit, producer Phillip Avalon devised the story and the basic script before bringing in Whitburn to improve it ("Denis Whitburn - The Screen Guide - Screen Australia", n.d.).

Unique feature of the film is that the cast includes British professional boxer Joe Bugner, who gained the nickname "Aussie Joe" after moving to Australia to stay and make a late return to the ring.

Plot

Synopsis 

Nobody thought the stone was truly cursed... In the view of the robbers who took it, it was just another jewel... But like with all great mystery thrillers, things are not what they appear to be ("The Sher Mountain Killings Mystery (1990) - The Screen Guide - Screen Australia", n.d.).

Storyline 

When Davey Joe (Jeffrey Rhoe) is hired to take an ancient stone from an old Ranger's castle, he keeps it for himself in the expectation that it would bring him good luck and endless life. However, what follows is a path of mystery and deception. While Davey Joe running away, he hid the cursed stone under Caine’s (Phil Avalon) bed and the possession of gemstone turned over the Caine. Alex (Tom Richards) brings his mute brother Caine (Phil Avalon) on some kind of field trip to Sher Mountain, unaware that Caine has the cursed stone in his hands.

Alex departs with Caine, meanwhile Conrad and Sole bring Davey-Joe to his sister Muriel's place, where he has concealed the glowing cursed stone beneath Caine's bed (Conrad also complains that Davey-Joe could do with a bath). But the stone has vanished, and Caine is now with Alex, carrying the glowing stone, and they're visiting the Sher Mountain Forest ranger (Joe Bugner), who promotes Caine to Junior Ranger. The strange Ranger has pupils that shine an unsettling blue.

Conrad and Sole barged into Muriel and Davey-apartment Joe's in the city. Sole and the Conrad manage to elude Muriel and drive to the Sher Mountain Wilderness Park with Billy in the back car. Sole and Conrad apprehend them and, using Billy as a hostage, threaten Alex and order that he tell the location of the cursed stone. However, Alex kicks Conrad in the balls, and he, Billy, and Caine grab the opportunity to flee the hapless Sole and Conrad.  Sole, on the other hand, was able to reclaim ownership of the gemstone. However, this has had a detrimental effect. Ranger returned to take the gemstone. Sole shoots his rifle at the old ranger, but the shots miss as the figure takes back the bag and twists and contorts Sole's arm. Sole tries to run, but blue light streaming down from the heavens captures Sole. He bursts into flames and dies.

The blue light fades back into the skies, and the survivors gather at the ranger station, with Alex informing Davey-Joe that he's in trouble. "Thought I may be," a reflective Davey-Joe says. Muriel finally caught up to Billy, who moans over not being able to pee for three hours, while Alex walks in on Dianne, who rapidly returns to reality (Martin,1990), ("Sher Mountain Killings Mystery - Review - Photos - Ozmovies", n.d.).

Genre

Ozploitation 

“Sher mountain Killings Mystery” was made in Australia in 1990 and is categorized as an Ozploitation movie. ‘GCDb’ stated that the origin of the term comes from the fact that director Quentin Tarantino previously called the genre “Aussie-ploitation.” According to Mark Hartley's documentary Not Quite Hollywood (2008), 'Ozploitation' films, that further refer to 1970s and 1980s commercial genre films such as action, road movies, sexploitation, and horror movies, have dominated a precarious situation within such a small to medium-sized 'national' cinema driven by cultural policy (Mark, 2008). One of the most important elements of this genre was how it used Australian stereotypes and aspects of Australian culture to attract an Australian and possible audience from overseas (Mark, 2008).

Horror 

To extent of Ozploitation, ‘Sher Mountain Killings Mystery’ contains the key concepts that may arise with stereotypes that people have on Australia. Australians frequently filmed horror and horror-related films, most of which have been one of the most well enough and significant movies produced in the country. Yet, films seem to still be localized (O'Regan, 2008), with hardly any on-going effect. The finest ones, which are more genuinely 'Australian' in style (Hood, 1994), frequently minimize narrative movement and therefore do not actually fit into the shape of the mostly storyline horror genre.

Specific to this film, presence of Park ranger’s Castle, Magical stone and mysterious power gives horror and thriller tone to the film with the tendency of emphasizing ‘Australianness’ remaining true to social reality.

Characters

Production

Development 

Phill had been showing a positive feel for selecting scripts which would appeal to a global audience. Phil wanted to try something different, as such he started to write a mystery set in the early 1900s. He remembered how, when he was a kid, magical stones with a 'life force' were mentioned in children's stories. So Phil combined that thought with more mystery, such as how it was guarded by an old ranger on an isolated mountain. And by adding more points of interest, such as the stone being stolen, and He has a plot.  (Avalon, page 213)

Casting 

Before meeting with Vince, Phil Avalon had already decided on Tom Richard for the role of Alex Cordeaux because Tom had previously worked on the TV series Son and Daughter and played Peter Phelps' stepfather in 'Breaking Loose,' which was produced by Phil Avalon (Avalon, P215). Abigail was also the only choice for the role of Muriel because Phil had worked with her for a few years. Vince also proposed casts. Ric Carter was suggested for the position of Conrad. Ron Becks, an American actor, auditioned for the role of the main villain. At one point, Ron Beck was considered for the role of Conrad, but he was cast as Sole instead, and Ric Cater was placed as Conrad.

Phil needed a giant-sized actor to play the ranger, who would age 10 years. Shirley suggested World champion Boxer Joe Bugner who was unfamiliar to both Phil and Vince Martin. Bugner had acting experience in Europe, and he actually impressed both Phil and Vince. Phil took the role of Caine the mute. Actress Elizabeth McIvor, who had worked on cheers also joined the team. (Avalon, P215)

Filming 

"Vince has only directed TV shows, not independent films." He owned the skills and talents. Phil Avalon decided to give him the storyline and did ask Vince Martin to read it to see whether it was a film he wanted to direct. Fortunately, Vince enjoyed the storyline, and Phil and Vince began conducting location surveys." (Avalon, p215) Phil Avalon was able to get the film rolling with Ray Henman on camera thanks to the support of Phil's fellow Peter Taylor, who invested some funds (Avalon, p216).

Music 

From the ending credit of the film, Art Phillips composed the music and a band called GANK played the music. The band Gank gets an extended workout in the film. As it appears in SoundCloud, Kirke Godfrey, a member of the band, was not listed in the film lineup of the band while he was a main vocalist with Cameron Giles. Other than Art Phillip’s’ work, music ‘Voodoo” played and written by Allan Zavod was used in the film (Martin, 1990).

Distribution 

Phil had never written anything like the Sher Mountain mystery before. Phil presented it to Gary Hamilton, who had previously done a mystery film, to put it to the test. Gary stated that Columbia Pictures was looking for films for a forthcoming package that they'll be selling to South America. Gary says in the worst scenario, Phil should really be able to obtain at least $500,000 for regions other than Australia, but he would not commit until he saw a finished film. Phil was willing to take chances and engaged in personally funding the film. Phil Avalon was able to get the film started with Ray Henman on camera thanks to the financial support of Phil's fellow Peter Taylor.

Peter and Phil took the film to the American Film Market and secured a pre-sale for $500,000. The $50,000 down payment managed to secure the deal, and it fell through since the distribution company went bankrupt (Avalon, p215).

Reception 

(cinema papers no.78, March 1990)

Box Office 

The movie did not show up through the Film Victoria report on Australian box office, which isn't strange considering its minimal and limited initial run in Sydney and very limited appearances elsewhere. Its primary market has been the thriller/mystery/supernatural aisles of record shops and tv programs, so it picked up a tape sale in the United States under a new name, and in several of the other countries such as Columbia.

Critical Response 

Scott Murray defined Sher Mountain Killings Mystery as "simply one of least desirable thrillers made in this country" in his 1995 survey Australian Film. It contains several errors.

First mistake that Murray stated was poor script. no performer should be required to say the line "What happened here?" after the film has reached its climax, but that's exactly what Tom Richards gets. Moreover, Murray pointed out the direction. There are numerous repetitive framings from the same spot, implying that set up time was short and the film had to be finished in a couple weeks. The limitation of independent films such as low budget affected the final outcome. Last but not least Murray pointed out about characters. "Two of the cast are American for no narrative reason (Murray, 1993)" and producer Phil Avalon took on the role of mystical mute, staring quietly out into the distance, resulting throughout all of his scenes to become quiet and snail-paced which is controversial to its genre, Horror film/Thriller. The way that character was setted up wasn’t explained or had only a small effect on the actual storyline (Murray, 1993).

Accolades 

Phillip Avalon
Starting from producing films with Summer City in 1977 and continued with Breaking Loose, Fatal Bond, Sher Mountain Killings Mystery and a dozen more, including his 2014 war drama, William Kelly's War as well as Hot Water, Phil’s movies were screened at the Sanctuary Cove Film Festival. So, with the previous achievements, Phil was honored with a lifetime achievement award ("PHIL AVALON, SURFING THE MOVIE WAVE", 2015).
 
Art Phillips            
Nominated for the best original Music Score at the AFI awards (also known as AACTA Awards ("Art Phillips - IMDb", n.d.), but lose against Chris Gough and Phill Judd for The Big Steal.

References

External links
Sher Mountain Killings Mystery at IMDb
Sher Mountain Killings Mystery at Oz Movies
Sher Mountain Killing Mystery at The Screen Guide
Sher Mountain Killngs Mystery at Rotten Tomatoes

Australian mystery thriller films
1990s English-language films